Jacqui Frisby is a camogie player and an accounts assistant, winner of a camogie All Star award in 2009. She played in the 2009 All Ireland camogie final. An All-Ireland Junior medal winner in 2002, Jacqui added a National League medal in 2008. She holds Leinster titles in the Under- 14, Under-16, Under-18, Junior and Senior grades along with an All-Ireland Schools 'B' medal. Her brother   represented Kilkenny at under-age level. Her senior debut was in 2001.

References

External links 
 Official Camogie Website
 Kilkenny Camogie Website
 of 2009 championship in On The Ball Official Camogie Magazine
 https://web.archive.org/web/20091228032101/http://www.rte.ie/sport/gaa/championship/gaa_fixtures_camogie_oduffycup.html Fixtures and results] for the 2009 O'Duffy Cup
 All-Ireland Senior Camogie Championship: Roll of Honour
 Video highlights of 2009 championship Part One and part two
 Video Highlights of 2009 All Ireland Senior Final
 Report of All Ireland final in Irish Times Independent and Examiner

1985 births
Living people
Kilkenny camogie players